Human Rights Party or similar may refer to:

 Unity for Human Rights Party, in Albania
 Human Rights Party (Australia), in New South Wales
 Human Rights Party (Cambodia)
 For Human Rights in United Latvia
 Human Rights Party (Malaysia)
 Human Rights Party (New Zealand)
 Human Rights Protection Party, in Samoa
 Human Rights Party (United States), in Michigan